Voice of an Angel is the debut studio album by then-12-year-old soprano Charlotte Church, released in 1998. The Sony Music recording was extremely popular, selling millions of copies, and made Church the youngest artist in history with a number 1 album on the British classical crossover charts. The album is a collection of arias, sacred songs and traditional pieces.

Track listing

Note: Sian Edwards conducted the Orchestra and Chorus of Welsh National Opera, with Meinir Huelyn on harp.

Charts and certifications

Weekly charts

Year-end charts

Certifications

Release history

References

1998 debut albums
Charlotte Church albums
Classical crossover albums
Sony Classical Records albums